Nanna may refer to:
Grandmother

Mythology
 Sin (mythology), god of the moon in Sumerian mythology, also called Suen
 Nanna (Norse deity), goddess associated with the god Baldr in Norse mythology
 Nana Buluku, Fon/Dahomey androgynous deity creator of the universe

People
 Nanna Bryndís Hilmarsdóttir (born 1989), Icelandic singer
 Nanna Egedius (1913–1986), Norwegian figure skater
 Nanna Hoffman (1846–1920), Swedish entrepreneur
 Nanna Lüders Jensen (born 1963), Danish singer, stage name Nanna
 Nanna Stenersen (1914–1977), Norwegian actress
 Bob Nanna (born 1975), American singer and guitarist

Science
 1203 Nanna, an asteroid
 Nanna (moth), a genus of moth
 Nanna (fly), a genus of fly

Other uses
 Nanna (serial), a Telugu television serial
 Nanna (album), a 2015 album by Xavier Rudd and the United Nations
 Nanna, North 24 Parganas, an outgrowth of Kanchrapara, West Bengal, India

See also
 Nana (disambiguation)
 Rafi Khawar (died 1986), Pakistani film actor and comedian also known as Nanha
 Inanna